Daniel Rusitovic (born 24 January 1976) is an Australian former judoka. He competed in the men's half-heavyweight event at the 2000 Summer Olympics.

References

External links
 

1976 births
Living people
Australian male judoka
Olympic judoka of Australia
Judoka at the 2000 Summer Olympics
Judoka at the 2002 Commonwealth Games
Commonwealth Games bronze medallists for Australia
Commonwealth Games medallists in judo
Sportspeople from Sydney
Medallists at the 2002 Commonwealth Games